Sanchezia is a genus of the plant family Acanthaceae. It is estimated to contain about 20 to 50 species. Members of this genus are shrubs, rarely small trees or herbs, occurring in the lowlands of tropical South and Central America. A close relative is Suessenguthia, which looks quite similar.

Because they have large, colorful bracts and flowers, and sometimes even colorful leaves, several species are cultivated as ornamental plants throughout the tropics and in botanical gardens of temperate areas. Examples for species well known from cultivation are S. nobilis, S. parvibracteata and S. speciosa. In some areas, ornamental species have become problematic as invasive weeds. On the other hand, S. lampra from Ecuador is almost extinct.

Sanchezia is named for José Sánchez, a nineteenth-century professor of botany at Cádiz, Spain.

Selected species
 Sanchezia lampra
 Sanchezia ovata Ruiz & Pav.
 Sanchezia parvibracteata
 Sanchezia parviflora
 Sanchezia peruviana
 Sanchezia putumayensis
 Sanchezia sericea
 Sanchezia speciosa Leonard
 Sanchezia nobilis (zh) Hook.f.
 Sanchezia oblonga (:wikispecies:Sanchezia oblonga)

Footnotes

References
  (1987): Tropical Shrubs. University of Hawaii Press. 
  (1964): Sanchezia and related American Acanthaceae. Rhodora 66: 313-343.

External links

Tree of Life project
Sanchezia as an invasive weed

 
Acanthaceae genera
Taxa named by José Antonio Pavón Jiménez